Brian John Leonard (born 19 February 1946) is a British former motorcycle speedway rider.

Born in Newbury, Leonard followed his father Maurice into speedway. He started his career with second half rides at Oxford in 1962, and made his league debut later that year, riding for Poole Pirates and Swindon Robins. His first two years in speedway were marred by injury, suffering two collarbone breaks, and he missed four and a half months in 1963 with two broken bones in his left leg. In 1965 he signed for West Ham Hammers, where he steadily improved, averaging over seven points per match in the 1967 season. After a spell with Hackney Hawks in 1969, he moved on to Wembley Lions in 1970, also riding for Newport Wasps for a period. He moved to Swindon Robins in 1972, but by 1974 his average had dropped below four points. He was signed by Leicester Lions in 1975 but released after a poor run of results, due in part to a back injury, which led to his retirement from the sport. He returned in 1976 and fared better after dropping down to the National League with Oxford Cheetahs, averaging over seven points. The following year he scored less well, and after two matches in 1978 he retired.

References

1946 births
Living people
British speedway riders
English motorcycle racers
Poole Pirates riders
Swindon Robins riders
West Ham Hammers riders
Wembley Lions riders
Newport Wasps riders
Leicester Lions riders
Hackney Hawks riders
Oxford Cheetahs riders